Lucien Muratore (29 August 1876 – 16 July 1954, in Paris) was a French actor and operatic tenor, particularly associated with the French repertory.

Life and career 
Lucien Muratore was born Marseille to Italian parents from Piedmont. He trained first as a cornist, and later as an actor. He made his debut at the Odéon theatre in Paris, where he played opposite such actresses as Sarah Bernhardt and Réjane. He then studied at the Paris Music Conservatory, and made his operatic debut in 1902, at the Opéra-Comique, creating the King in Reynaldo Hahn's La carmélite.

He made his debut at La Monnaie in 1904, as Werther, and the following year at the Palais Garnier, as Renaud in Lully's Armide.

He created several Massenet operas such as Ariane and Bacchus, at the Opéra, and Roma, in Monte Carlo. He also took part in the creation of La Catalane by Le Borne, Monna Vanna by Henry Février, Déjanire by Camille Saint-Saëns, and Pénélope by Gabriel Fauré.

He became principal French tenor with the Boston Opera Company, the Chicago Grand Opera Company (1913–1914), the Chicago Opera Association (1915–1921), and the Chicago Civic Opera (1922). He also appeared at the Teatro Colón in Buenos Aires.

Muratore retired from the stage in 1931. He was married first to soprano Marguerite Bériza, and later to soprano Lina Cavalieri, with whom he appeared in a silent movie, Manon Lescaut, in 1914.

In 1944 Muratore was for a few weeks Director of the Opéra-Comique but was removed on the Liberation of Paris.

His art of singing was at times almost overshadowed by his immense talent as an actor and elegance on stage.

His students included Kenneth Neate, to whom he gave some of his own costumes for Don José (Bizet's Carmen).

Selected filmography
 The Shadow of Her Past (1915)
 The Unknown Singer (1931)
 The Faceless Voice (1933)

References

Sources
Roland Mancini and Jean-Jacques Rouveroux,  (orig. H. Rosenthal and J. Warrack, French edition), Guide de l’opéra, Les indispensables de la musique (Fayard, 1995).

External links

 History of the Tenor / Lucien Muratore / Sound Clips and Narration

1876 births
1954 deaths
French operatic tenors
French male film actors
French male silent film actors
French people of Italian descent
20th-century French male actors
Male actors from Marseille
Musicians from Marseille